Yves Forest,  (25 June 1921 – 18 July 2019) was a Liberal party member of the House of Commons of Canada. He was a lawyer by career.

Born in Sherbrooke, Quebec, Forest attended school at Saint-Charles Seminary in Sherbrooke, then earned a Bachelor of Arts and Bachelor of Laws at Université de Montréal.

He was first elected at the Stanstead riding in
the 1963 general election then re-elected there in the 1965 election. In the 1968 election, he was elected to another Parliamentary term at Missisquoi riding. Forest left federal politics when he was defeated in the 1972 federal election at Brome—Missisquoi.

Since January 2004, Forest became a director of the Historical Society of Magog and was honoured for his work in November 2009. He died in July 2019 at the age of 98.

References

External links
 

1921 births
2019 deaths
Liberal Party of Canada MPs
Members of the House of Commons of Canada from Quebec
Politicians from Sherbrooke
Lawyers in Quebec
Canadian King's Counsel
French Quebecers